"Bright Eyes" is a song written by British songwriter Mike Batt and performed by Art Garfunkel.  It was written for the soundtrack of the 1978 British animated adventure drama film Watership Down.  Rearranged as a pop song from its original form in the film, the track appears on British and European versions of Garfunkel's 1979 Fate for Breakfast and on the US versions of his 1981 album Scissors Cut. "Bright Eyes" topped the UK Singles Chart for six weeks and became Britain's biggest-selling single of 1979, selling over a million copies. Richard Adams, author of the original novel, is reported to have hated the song. A cover of the song was later used in the Watership Down television series explicitly as its theme song.

Background 
The song was written, produced and arranged by Mike Batt for Watership Down, with original director John Hubley requesting a song about death. It plays when the rabbit Hazel, the lead character in the film, almost dies after being wounded by a farmer's gun and Fiver, his little brother is led to him by the Black Rabbit of Inlé. Batt described recording the song as "one of the most difficult sessions" of his career (due to different musical opinions).

The pop single arrangement of the song was very successful in the United Kingdom, staying at number one in the UK Singles Chart for six weeks in 1979, selling over one million copies, becoming the biggest-selling single of the year. In the United States, it failed to reach the Billboard Hot 100.  It reached No. 29 on the Billboard Adult Contemporary chart.

Charts

Weekly charts

Year-end charts

Personnel 
 Art Garfunkel – vocals
 Mike Batt – arranger producer
 Chris Spedding – acoustic guitar
 Roland Harker – lute guitar
 Les Hurdle – bass guitar
 Roy J. Morgan – drums
 Edwin Roxburgh – oboe
 Ray Cooper – percussion

References 

1978 songs
1979 singles
Art Garfunkel songs
UK Singles Chart number-one singles
Songs written by Mike Batt
Pop ballads
Pandora (singer) songs
Columbia Records singles
Watership Down
Songs about death